Denis Vladimirovich Gurianov (born 7 June 1997) is a Russian professional ice hockey winger for the Montreal Canadiens of the National Hockey League (NHL).

Playing career
Gurianov was drafted 42nd overall by Lada Togliatti in the 2014 KHL Draft. In just his second season within the HC Lada Togliatti organization, Gurianov was recalled from the Minor Hockey League to make his professional debut in the 2014–15 KHL season. On 4 September 2014, he appeared in his first KHL contest as a 17-year-old in a 5–2 defeat to HC Ugra. He would dress in 8 games over the campaign recording 1 assist. He was included among the top prospects European rankings approaching the 2015 NHL Entry Draft and was selected 12th overall by the Dallas Stars in the Draft.

On 12 May 2016, Gurianov terminated his contract with Lada Togiliatti and signed a three-year entry-level contract with the Dallas Stars of the National Hockey League. He was assigned to the Texas Stars of the American Hockey League for the 2016–17 AHL season. Gurianov made his NHL debut on 8 April 2017, against the Colorado Avalanche.

After attending the Stars training camp and development camp, Gurianov was assigned to the Texas Stars to begin the 2018–19 AHL season. On 7 November, Gurianov was recalled to the NHL. He recorded his first career NHL goal on 10 November from a redirect of Ben Gleason's shot in the third period to give the Stars a one goal lead over the Nashville Predators. The Stars would lose the game to the Predators in overtime, 5–4. He was reassigned the next day to the Texas Stars. On 20 August 2020, Gurianov scored four goals in the Stars' 7–3 win over the Calgary Flames to advance to the second round of the 2020 Stanley Cup playoffs. He is the first player in Stars history to score four goals in one playoff game. On 14 September 2020, Gurianov scored the overtime winner against the Vegas Golden Knights in game five of the Western Conference Finals, sending Dallas to the 2020 Stanley Cup Finals for the first time since 2000.

On 22 October 2020, Gurianov signed a two-year, $5.1 million contract with the Stars. 

On 7 June 2022, he signed a one-year contract extension with the team. In the following 2022–23 season, Gurianov was unable to replicate his previous offensive contributions despite the Stars leading the Western Conference, posting two goals and nine points in 43 regular season games. On 26 February 2023, Gurianov was traded by the Stars to the Montreal Canadiens in exchange for fellow Russian, Evgenii Dadonov.

Career statistics

Regular season and playoffs

International

References

External links
 
 

1997 births
Living people
Dallas Stars draft picks
Dallas Stars players
Expatriate ice hockey players in the United States
HC Lada Togliatti players
Montreal Canadiens players
National Hockey League first-round draft picks
Russian expatriate ice hockey people
Russian expatriate sportspeople in the United States
Russian ice hockey right wingers
Sportspeople from Tolyatti
Texas Stars players